Juventus F.C. was a Belizean football team, based in Orange Walk, which currently competes in the Belize Premier Football League (BPFL) of the Football Federation of Belize. Their home stadium is Orange Walk People's Stadium.

Achievements
The "Suga Boys" were one of the greatest football teams in Belize. They have won 5 league trophies. They were the only team to win continental CONCACAF matches for Belize. Their last continental victory was 4–1 over Olimpia.
Belize Premier League: 5 
 1995/96, 1996/97, 1997/97, 1998/99, 2005

Performance in CONCACAF  competitions
CONCACAF Cup Winners Cup 2 appearances
1996 – Qualifying stage (Central Zone)
1996 – Qualifying stage (Central Zone)

Current squad

Former players

  Mohammed Yousif Rahim

External links
Juventus

Football clubs in Belize
Association football clubs established in 1978
1978 establishments in Belize